Joni Harms (born November 5, 1959, in Canby, Oregon) is an American country music singer-songwriter. Between 1990 and 2011, Harms released eleven studio albums plus her album Oregon to Ireland recorded live with The Sheerin Family Band in Moate, Ireland and released in 2014. She also charted two singles on the Billboard Hot Country Singles & Tracks chart. Her highest charting single, "I Need a Wife," peaked at No. 34 in 1989.

Discography

Albums

Singles

References

External links

[ Joni Harms] at Allmusic

1959 births
American country singer-songwriters
American women country singers
Living people
People from Canby, Oregon
Singer-songwriters from Oregon
21st-century American women